Filergan (also Romanized as Fīlergān; also known as Fīlevarjān, Fīlūrjān, and Pīlergān) is a village in Sohr va Firuzan Rural District, Pir Bakran District, Falavarjan County, Isfahan Province, Iran. At the 2006 census, its population was 562, in 138 families.

References 

Populated places in Falavarjan County